William J. Shaw (born 1886) was a Scottish professional footballer who played for Kilmarnock, Bristol Rovers, Dumbarton Harp and Cowdenbeath.

Shaw joined Bristol Rovers from Kilmarnock in 1909 and went on to play 103 times in the Southern League for Rovers, scoring six goals, before moving to Dumbarton Harp in 1912.

References

Sources

1886 births
Year of death missing
Footballers from East Ayrshire
Scottish footballers
Association football midfielders
Kilmarnock F.C. players
Bristol Rovers F.C. players
Dumbarton Harp F.C. players
Cowdenbeath F.C. players
Scottish Football League players
Southern Football League players